Steve Collins (born 9 April 1974) is an Australian former professional rugby league footballer who played in the 1990s and 2000s.

Playing career

First Division Grand Final appearances
Collins played , and scored a try in Featherstone Rovers' 22–24 defeat by Wakefield Trinity in the 1998 First Division Grand Final at McAlpine Stadium, Huddersfield on 26 September 1998.

Club career
Collins was transferred from Parramatta Eels to Featherstone Rovers, signed by Steve Simms, Steve Collins made his début for Featherstone Rovers on Sunday 1 February 1998, and he played his last match for Featherstone Rovers during the 1998–season.

References

External links
(archived by web.archive.org) Stats → Past Players → C at hullfc.com
 (archived by web.archive.org) Statistics at hullfc.com
Search for "Justin Collins" at britishnewspaperarchive.co.uk
Search for "Steve Collins" at britishnewspaperarchive.co.uk

1974 births
Australian rugby league players
Canberra Raiders players
Featherstone Rovers players
Hull F.C. players
Living people
Newcastle Thunder players
Parramatta Eels players
Rugby league centres
Rugby league fullbacks
Rugby league wingers